Darlene R. Ketten is an American Senior Scientist at the Woods Hole Oceanographic Institution.  She is best known for her work on marine mammal science, the biomechanics of hearing, and hearing loss.

Biography 
Ketten received her B.A. from Washington University in St. Louis in 1971.  In 1979, she completed her M.S. at Massachusetts Institute of Technology, and in 1985 she earned her Ph.D. from Johns Hopkins University.  Ketten has been affiliated with Harvard Medical School since 1985.  Since 1997, she has been affiliated with the Woods Hole Oceanographic Institution.  From 2013-2015, she was a Professor of Physics at Curtin University, Australia.  In 2015, she was a Fellow at the Hanse-Wissenschaftskolleg in Germany and from 2015-2016 served as a Jefferson Science Fellow in the Bureau of Near Eastern Affairs of the United States Department of State and at the US Embassy in Berlin. Ketten is a Fellow of the American Association for the Advancement of Science and of the  Acoustical Society of America.

Ketten's research on hearing has raised questions about the impacts of human uses of sonar on the hearing and navigation of whales and other marine mammals.

References

External links 
Google Scholar

Living people
Year of birth missing (living people)
Washington University in St. Louis alumni
Massachusetts Institute of Technology alumni
Johns Hopkins University alumni
Harvard Medical School faculty
Woods Hole Oceanographic Institution
Jefferson Science Fellows
Fellows of the American Association for the Advancement of Science
Fellows of the Acoustical Society of America